The Naruto manga series, written and illustrated by Masashi Kishimoto, is split in two parts to divide the storyline; the second part is simply known as Part II. The plot follows the return of the ninja Naruto Uzumaki to Konohagakure, after two and a half years of training after leaving his teammates Sakura Haruno and Kakashi Hatake, and his subsequent efforts to make his best friend, Sasuke Uchiha, return with him and his friends. However, the criminal organization Akatsuki begins to hunt Naruto to get the Nine-Tailed Demon Fox that is sealed within him.

Part II starts at chapter 245 and is set two and a half years after the conclusion of chapter 238 in Part I. Chapters 239 through 244 form a gaiden set before the Naruto manga and detail part of Kakashi Hatake's history. All subsequent chapters are considered to be part of the Part II storyline. Naruto is published in individual chapters by Shueisha in Weekly Shōnen Jump and is later collected in tankōbon format with various extras. While the series started serialization in issue 43 of 1999, Part II started in issue 19 of 2005. Volume 28, the first volume of Part II, was released on June 3, 2005, while volume 48 was released on November 4, 2009.

An anime adaptation of Part II, produced by Studio Pierrot and TV Tokyo, started to air on February 15, 2007, on TV Tokyo under the name . These episodes began to air immediately after the end of the original Naruto anime, which had been showing filler episodes in order to widen the plot gap between the anime and the manga.

The English serialization of the Naruto manga is licensed by Viz Media and is currently published simultaneously in North America in the Weekly Shonen Jump digital magazine. It was originally serialized in the now-defunct monthly Shonen Jump print magazine. English language trade volumes are published both in print and digitally through Viz Media's website. In order to compensate for occasional gaps between the Japanese and English adaptations of the manga, Viz Media has periodically announced special campaigns during which they release several volumes within a relatively short period of time. Volume 28 was released in English by Viz Media on March 4, 2008, and volume 48 was released on June 1, 2010. The second box set containing the volumes from the first half of Part II was released in the United States by Viz Media on July 7, 2015.



Volume list

References

External links
 Official Shueisha Naruto site 
 Official Viz Media Naruto site

Chapters (Part II)